The 2003–04 NCAA Division III men's ice hockey season began on October 18, 2003 and concluded on March 20 of the following year. This was the 31st season of Division III college ice hockey.

Regular season

Season tournaments

Standings

Note: Mini-game are not included in final standings

2004 NCAA Tournament

Note: * denotes overtime period(s)

See also
 2003–04 NCAA Division I men's ice hockey season

References

External links

 
NCAA